The Intercity Train eXpress-Saemaeul abbreviated as ITX-Saemaeul is a class of train operated by Korail, the national railroad of South Korea, it was introduced on May 12, 2014, to replace the Saemaeul-ho. The new ITX-Saemaeul trains have a faster average speed of 150 kilometers per hour. The name was taken from the Saemaul Undong after a public competition to determine the new train's name.

Lines served

Stops

Stations served 
 Stations in bold are required stops.
Gyeongbu Line (SeoulーBusan):
Seoul, Yeongdeungpo, Suwon, Pyeongtaek, Cheonan, Jochiwon, Daejeon, Yeongdong, Gimcheon,  Gumi, Waegwan, Daegu, Dongdaegu, Gyeongsan, Cheongdo, Miryang, Mulgeum, Gupo, Busan

Donghae Line (SeoulーSinhaeundae):
Seoul, Yeongdeungpo, Suwon, Pyeongtaek, Cheonan, Jochiwon, Daejeon, Yeongdong, Gimcheon,  Gumi, Daegu, Dongdaegu, Gyeongsan, Miryang, Gupo, Bujeon, Sinhaeundae

Gyeongjeon Line (SeoulーJinju):
Seoul, Yeongdeungpo, Suwon, Pyeongtaek, Cheonan, Jochiwon, Daejeon, Gimcheon, Gumi, Waegwan, Daegu, Dongdaegu, Gyeongsan, Cheongdo, Miryang, Jinyeong, Changwonjungang, Changwon, Masan, Haman, Jinju

Honam Line (YongsanーMokpo):
Yongsan, Yeongdeungpo, Suwon, Pyeongtaek, Cheonan, Jochiwon, Seodaejeon, Gyeryong, Nonsan, Ganggyeong, Iksan, Gimje, Sintaein, Jeongeup, Jangseong, GwangjuSongjeong, Naju, Hampyeong, Illo, Mokpo

Gwangju Line (YongsanーGwangju):
Yongsan, Yeongdeungpo, Suwon, Pyeongtaek, Cheonan, Jochiwon, Seodaejeon, Gyeryong,  Nonsan, Ganggyeong, Iksan, Gimje, Sintaein, Jeongeup, Jangseong, Gwangju

Jeolla Line (YongsanーYeosu Expo):
Yongsan, Yeongdeungpo, Suwon, Pyeongtaek, Cheonan, Seodaejeon, Gyeryong,  Nonsan, Ganggyeong, Iksan, Jeonju, Namwon, Gokseong, Guryegu, Suncheon, Yeocheon, Yeosu Expo

Jungang line (CheongnyangniーAndong):
Cheongnyangni, Deokso, Yangpyeong, Yongmun, Jipyeong, Seokbul, Ilsin, Maegok, Yangdong, Samsan, Seowonju, Wonju, Bongyang, Jecheon, Danyang, Punggi, Yeongju, Andong

Rolling stock

 Korail Class 210000 (since October 2014)

Formations

The first rolling stock was manufactured by Hyundai Rotem; in 2018 Dawonsys received a contract to deliver additional rolling stock.

Interior
seats in 2+2 abreast configuration.

References 

Korail
Electric multiple units of South Korea